is a Japanese semiconductor manufacturer headquartered in Tokyo, Japan, initially incorporated in 2002 as Renesas Technology, the consolidated entity of the semiconductor units of Hitachi and Mitsubishi excluding their dynamic random-access memory businesses, to which NEC Electronics merged in 2010, resulting in a minor change in the corporate name and logo to as it is now.

In the 2000s to early 2010s, Renesas had been one of the six largest semiconductor companies in the world. As of 2022, it is the world's third-largest automotive semiconductor company and the largest microcontroller supplier. The company also has presences in the markets of analogue and mixed-signal integrated circuits, memory devices, and SoCs.

The brand Renesas is a contraction of "Renaissance Semiconductor for Advanced Solutions".

History 

Renesas Electronics started operation in April 2010, through the integration of NEC Electronics, established in November 2002 as a spin-off of the semiconductor operations of NEC with the exception of the DRAM business, and Renesas Technology established on April 1, 2003, the non-DRAM chip joint venture of Hitachi and Mitsubishi, with their ownership percentage of 55 and 45 in order. The DRAM businesses of the three had become part of Elpida Memory, which went bankrupt in 2012 before being acquired by Micron Technology.

A basic agreement to merge was reached by April 2010 and materialized on the first day, forming the fourth largest semiconductor company by revenue according to an estimation from iSuppli.

In December 2010, Renesas Mobile Corporation (RMC) was created by integrating the Mobile Multimedia Business Unit of Renesas with the acquired Nokia Wireless Modem Business Unit.

In 2011, Renesas Electronics was adversely affected by the 2011 Tōhoku earthquake and tsunami and flooding in Thailand. In 2012, the company, which had about 50 thousand employees of manufacturing, design and sales operations in about 20 countries in 2011, decided to restructure its business, including the sale and consolidation of its Japanese domestic plants, to become profitable. In December 2012, INCJ, a Japanese public-private fund, and several key clients decided to invest in the company. Through the investment, Renesas aimed to secure 150 billion yen as fresh capital by September 2013 and make use of it for investment in development of the microcontroller and analog and power chips for automotive and industrial uses, plant improvements, and corporate acquisitions.

In January 2013, Renesas transferred some of its back-end plants to J-Devices.

In September 2013, Broadcom acquired most of Renesas Mobile Communication.

With the allotment of third-party shares to the nine investors completed in September 2013, INCJ became the largest shareholder in the company. Renesas announced its new business direction and issued its corporate presentation titled "Reforming Renesas” in October 2013.

In the fiscal year ended in March 2014, Renesas recorded its first ever net profit since it started operation as Renesas Electronics Corporation in 2010.

In July 2014, the subsidiary Renesas Mobile Communication was consolidated, after the company had decided to withdraw from the 4G wireless business.

In September 2014, the sale of the display driver IC unit of Renesas to Synaptics was completed.

In September 2016, Renesas announced that it would acquire Intersil for $3.2 billion. In February 2017, Renesas completed the acquisition.

In April 2017, Renesas unveiled a self-driving concept car at a global developer conference, stating that it will start delivering a new line of products for self-driving cars in December 2017, as it takes on global giants such as Intel. The new technology acts as an onboard nerve center, coordinating and controlling vehicle functions.

In September 2018, Renesas announced that it has agreed to buy Integrated Device Technology for $6.7 billion. The acquisition was completed in March 2019.

In 2020, Renesas announced its plans to wind down its production of diodes and the compound device.

In February 2021, Renesas announced that it has agreed to buy Dialog Semiconductor for $5.9 billion. The acquisition was completed in September 2021.

In March 2021, a fire at the Naka Factory owned by a subsidiary of Renesas caused significant damage to equipment. On April 17, 2022, Renesas restarted its production at the Naka Factory.

In August 2021, Renesas completed the acquisition of Dialog Semiconductor Plc.

In December 2021, Renesas also completed the acquisition of Celeno Communications.

In May 2022 Renesas announced the re-opening of its "Kofu" Fab which will utilize the 300mm geometry for the fabrication of power semiconductors. The facility is scheduled to be online in 2024.

In July 2022, Renesas completed the acquisition of Reality Analytics, Inc. Adding additional resources for Machine Learning and Artificial Intelligence.

In October 2022, Renesas completed the acquisition of Steradian Semiconductors Private Limited, a fabless semiconductor company.

In September 2022, Renesas signed a strategic partnership with VinFast from Vietnam to announce expanding agreement of automotive technology development of electric vehicles (EVs) and delivery of system components.

In December 2022, Renesas won the 2022 “Outstanding Asia-Pacific Semiconductor Company Award” by Global Semiconductor Alliance.

Microcontrollers

The RL78 MCU family 
RL78 is the family name for a range of 16-bit microcontrollers. These were the first new MCU to emerge from the new Renesas Electronics company after the merger of NEC Electronics and Renesas Technology. These Microcontrollers incorporate the core features of the NEC 78K0R (150 nm MF2 flash process) and many familiar peripherals from legacy Renesas R8C microcontrollers. The RL78 core variants include the S1, S2, and S3 type cores which evolved from the NEC 78K0R core. The basic S1 core support 74 instructions, the S2 core adds register banking and supports 75 instructions, while the S3 core adds an on-chip multiplier / divider / multiple-accumulate and supports 81 instructions.

The RL78 was developed to address extremely low power but highly integrated microcontroller applications, to this end the core offered a novel low power mode of operation called “snooze mode” where the ADC or serial interface can be programmed to meet specific conditions to wake the device from the extreme low power STOP mode of 0.52uA.

The RX MCU family 
The RX, an acronym for Renesas Xtreme, is the family name for a range of 32-bit microcontrollers developed by Renesas, as opposed to the H family and the MC family, launched by Hitachi and Mitsubishi respectively.

The RX family was launched in 2009 by Renesas Technology with the first product range designated the RX600 series and targeting applications such as metering, motor control, human–machine interfaces (HMI), networking, and industrial automation. Since 2009 this MCU family range has been enlarged with a smaller variant the RX200 series and also through enhanced performance versions.

The RA MCU family 
The RA, an acronym for Renesas Advanced, is the family name for a range of 32-bit microcontrollers with Arm Cortex processor cores. The RA family's key features are the stronger embedded security, high-performance, and CoreMark ultra-low power operation. It also has a comprehensive partner ecosystem and Flexible Software Package for the users.

Microprocessors

The RZ Arm-based 32 & 64-bit family 
The Renesas RZ family is a high-end 32 & 64 bit microprocessors that is designed for the implementations of high resolution human machine interface (HMI), embedded vision, real-time control, and industrial ethernet connectivity. It supports 6 protocols: PROFINET, EtherNET/IP, POWERLINK, Modbus/TCP, EtherCAT, RT/IRT, TSN and Sercos III.

The family includes, RZ/A and RZ/G for HMI, RZ/T for high-speed real-time control, and RZ/N for the network.

Corporate affairs
The largest stockholders and their ownership ratio of Renesas are as follows as of June 30, 2022.

At the beginning of June 2022, Renesas announced its completion of an approx. 200 billion yen worth buyback of its shares.

At the end of September 2013, Renesas issued new shares through third-party allotment resulting in INCJ becoming the new largest shareholder and non-parental controlling shareholder.

In early May 2012, NEC transferred part of its stake in Renesas to its employee pension trust. As a result, the NEC pension fund held 32.4 percent of Renesas while NEC had 3.0 percent.

Manufacturing sites
As of 2022, the in-house wafer fabrication of the semiconductor device is conducted by Renesas Electronics and Renesas Semiconductor Manufacturing, a wholly owned subsidiary, operating five front-end plants in the following areas: 
 Naka, Takasaki, Saijo, Kawashiri, Palm Bay
The back-end facilities, directly affiliated to Renesas Electronics and its subsidiaries, are located in:
 Yonezawa, Oita, Nishiki, Beijing, Suzhou, Kuala Lumpur, Penang
In May 2022 Renesas announced the re-opening of the "Kofu" Fab which will utilize the 300mm geometry for the fabrication of power semiconductors. The facility is scheduled to be online in 2024.

References 

Microcontroller companies
Japanese companies established in 2010
Companies listed on the Tokyo Stock Exchange
Electronics companies established in 2010
Japanese brands
Manufacturing companies based in Tokyo
Multinational companies headquartered in Japan
Semiconductor companies of Japan